Zuhair Hassan (born 19 August 1995), known professionally as Big Zuu, is a British rapper, grime MC, songwriter, DJ and television personality from West London. He is best known for presenting Big Zuu's Big Eats for Dave.

Early and personal life
Hassan was born in London and grew up on the Mozart Estate in Harrow Road, west London. His mother is from Sierra Leone and his father is from Lebanon, however, his father was absent during his childhood. During his gap year between college and university, Hassan worked as a mentor for young children in a secondary school in Haggerston, East London. He then spent two years at Goldsmiths University in New Cross studying towards a community development and youth work degree. He is a member of the MTP crew (My Team Paid), a rap group that consists of his cousin AJ Tracey and other grime MCs such as Ets and others; much like AJ Tracey, his first demos were recorded at their local youth centre, The Rugby Club, which let them use their studio so long as no expletives were used during the recording, forcing him to become creative to make his point.

In a 2018 interview with Red Bull, Hassan stated that his music style was influenced by "old school" artists such as Tupac Shakur, Jme, P Money, Ghetts and Skepta.

He is an avid supporter of Liverpool.

Television career
In late 2019, UKTV channel Dave commissioned a new food show starring Hassan and various stand-up comedians. The show, Big Zuu's Big Eats, began broadcasting on 15 May 2020. It features Hassan and two friends, Tubsey and Hyder, in a 10-part series cooking for stand-up comedians who were touring the UK. For each comedian they prepare a made-to-order pre-show appetiser, followed by a three-course meal. Rosie Jones, Desiree Burch, Ed Gamble, Jamali Maddix, Jimmy Carr, Josh Widdicombe, London Hughes, Lou Sanders, Phil Wang and Guz Khan make guest appearances in the series. In September 2020 it was confirmed that the show would return for two special episodes followed by a second series in 2021. The third series premiered on 4 July 2022; guests include Johnny Vegas, Katherine Ryan and Mel B. 

He appeared on episode 11 of series 2 of Guessable. He made an appearance on Jon & Lucy's Christmas Sleepover.

Hassan presented Big Zuu's Breakfast Show on Sunday mornings throughout the spring and summer of 2022 on ITV.

In May 2022, Hassan won two Bafta TV Awards – entertainment performance and features for his show Big Zuu’s Big Eats at the 2022 British Academy Television Awards.

Discography

Studio albums

Singles

As featured artist

Filmography

Television

Publications
 Big Zuu's Big Eats, 2021

References

1995 births
Living people
Black British DJs
Black British male rappers
English male rappers
English television personalities
Alumni of Goldsmiths, University of London
People from London
Grime music artists
English people of Sierra Leonean descent
English people of Lebanese descent
People from the London Borough of Camden